Paola Suárez won in the final 6–3, 6–4 against Sonya Jeyaseelan.

Seeds
A champion seed is indicated in bold text while text in italics indicates the round in which that seed was eliminated.

  Corina Morariu (quarterfinals)
  Cristina Torrens Valero (second round)
  Alexia Dechaume-Balleret (first round)
  Sylvia Plischke (second round)
  Lenka Němečková (second round)
  Sonya Jeyaseelan (final)
  Lea Ghirardi (first round)
  Mariana Díaz Oliva (second round)

Draw

External links
 1998 Copa Colsanitas Draw

Copa Colsanitas
1998 WTA Tour